23S rRNA pseudouridine2604 synthase (RluF, YjbC) is an enzyme with systematic name 23S rRNA-uridine2604 uracil mutase. This enzyme catalyses the following chemical reaction

 23S rRNA uridine2604  23S rRNA pseudouridine2604

The enzyme can, to a small extent, also react with uridine2605.

References

External links 
 

EC 5.4.99